Baron Kilkeel is a title in the Peerage of the United Kingdom. It was created on 19 May 2018 by Queen Elizabeth II as a subsidiary title for her grandson Prince Harry, Duke of Sussex, upon the occasion of his marriage to Meghan Markle. It is named after the small fishing port of Kilkeel, County Down, with a population of 6,887, in the  District of Newry, Mourne and Down in Northern Ireland. On the same day, he was also created Duke of Sussex and Earl of Dumbarton. Traditionally, male members of the royal family are granted at least one title on their wedding day by the monarch.

History 
Prior to 2018, there had never been a noble title connected to Kilkeel, which lies within the historic barony of Mourne. In the Middle Ages, it was said to be the centre of power of the Mugdorna (Múrna, Mughdorna, Mourne), an Irish tribe. It is located near the Mourne Mountains and is used as the base for a large fishing fleet.

The barony was newly created to allow Prince Harry to hold a Northern Irish title. The title of the barony was discussed between the Queen and Prince Harry privately; however, the Queen was the one who chose the title to bestow.

First creation, 2018

| Prince HarryHouse of Windsor2018–presentalso: Duke of Sussex and Earl of Dumbarton (2018)
| 
| 15 September 1984St Mary's Hospital, Londonson of Charles, Prince of Wales, and Lady Diana Spencer
| Meghan Markle19 May 20182 children, Prince Archie of Sussex Princess Lilibet of Sussex
|  now  old
|-
|}

Line of succession

 Prince Harry, Baron Kilkeel (b. 1984) 
 (1) Prince Archie of Sussex (b. 2019)

References 

Prince Harry, Duke of Sussex
Baronies in the Peerage of the United Kingdom
2018 establishments in the United Kingdom
Noble titles created in 2018